The Cide Temple on Dianziding Street, also known as the Dianziding, Liujia, Mazu, or Tianhou Temple, is a temple northwest of Lotus Lake in Zuoying District, Kaohsiung, Taiwan. In Chinese, it is commonly distinguished by its location.

History
The temple was originally built as an unnamed temple to the Chinese earth god Tudigong. In 1821, the temple was renamed the Palace of Kindness and Virtue and rededicated to both Tudigong and Mazu, the deified form of Lin Moniang from medieval Fujian who is worshipped as the Goddess of Sea and also honoured as the Queen of Heaven. In 1941, amid the Second World War, the Japanese occupation government converted to an agriculture office and later a regimental branch office. The Japanese ordered the demolition of the palace, but it was rebuilt from 1973 to 1976.

Services
On Mazu's birthday according to the Chinese lunar calendar, the temple hosts a Taiwanese opera group who performs on a stage in front of the temple's main hall.

See also
 Qianliyan & Shunfeng'er
 List of Mazu temples around the world
 Chi Ming Palace
 Zuoying Ciji Temple
 Zhouzi Qingshui Temple
 Spring and Autumn Pavilions
 List of temples in Taiwan
 Religion in Taiwan

References

1687 establishments in Taiwan
Mazu temples in Kaohsiung
Religious buildings and structures completed in 1687
Zuoying District